Caballo Lake is a reservoir on the Rio Grande created by the Caballo Dam in southern New Mexico, United States. It is the fourth largest reservoir in New Mexico in terms of surface area and the fifth largest body of water in New Mexico in terms of volume.

The lake is used for recreational activities, such as boating, swimming, waterskiing, and fishing. Fish in the lake include walleye, bass, catfish, crappie, and bluegill.

Caballo Lake is also a birdwatching site. Many migratory birds use the lake as a rest stop during their travels, and eagles are often seen in the area.

Caballo Lake is named for the Caballo Mountains that border the lake to the northeast, east, and southeast, in which wild horses roamed; Caballo means "horse" in Spanish. The upper area of the lake is very shallow and, in times of low water, has been blocked from the lower, deeper end of the lake. The beaches of Caballo are rocky when compared to Elephant Butte Reservoir, but there are many sandy areas. Beware of the whirlpool at the dam, as it can be a hazard.

External links

 
 "Caballo Lake State Park", State Parks Division, New Mexico
 Caballo Dam, Bureau of Reclamation

Reservoirs in New Mexico
Rio Grande
Bodies of water of Sierra County, New Mexico
Protected areas of Sierra County, New Mexico
Buildings and structures in Sierra County, New Mexico